The men's beach volleyball tournament at the 2014 Asian Games was held from September 20 to September 29, 2014 in Incheon, South Korea.

Schedule
All times are Korea Standard Time (UTC+09:00)

Results
Legend
r — Retired

Preliminary

Pool A

Pool B

Pool C

Pool D

Pool E

Pool F

Pool G

Pool H

Knockout round

Final standing

References

Results

External links
AVC official page
Official website

Women